Turkey's national Under-21 football team, also known as Turkey Under-21s or Turkey U-21s, is the Under-21 years of age team of the Turkey national football team.

History
This team is for Turkish players aged 21 or under at the start of a two-year European Under-21 Football Championship campaign, so players can be, and often are, up to 23 years old. Also in existence are teams for Under-20s (for non-UEFA tournaments), Under-19s and Under 17s. As long as they are eligible, players can play at any level, making it possible to play for the U-21s, senior side and again for the U-21s, as Oğuzhan Özyakup has done recently. It is also possible to play for one country at youth level and another at senior level (providing the player is eligible).

Competitive Record

UEFA European Under-21 Championship Record

*Draws include knockout matches decided by penalty shoot-out.

Toulon Tournament
 2002 Toulon Tournament - 8th place
 2004 Toulon Tournament - 7th place
 2008 Toulon Tournament - 6th place
 2012 Toulon Tournament - 2nd place
 2018 Toulon Tournament - 3rd place

Results and fixtures

2020

2021

2022

Players

Current squad
 The following players were called up for the friendly matches.
 Match dates: 17 and 21 November 2022
 Opposition:  and 
 Caps and goals correct as of: 27 September 2022, after the match against .

Recent call-ups
The following players have been called up for the team within the last 12 months and are still eligible to represent.

SEN = Player have been called up to the senior team.
INJ = Not part of the current squad due to injury.

Former squads
2000 UEFA European Under-21 Football Championship squads – Turkey

Former players

 Abdullah Ercan
 Alpay Özalan
 Arda Turan
 Arif Erdem
 Bülent Korkmaz
 Colin Kazim-Richards
 Emre Aşık
 Emre Belözoğlu
 Fatih Terim
 Gökhan Töre
 Gökhan Zan
 Hakan Şükür
 Halil Altıntop
 Mehmet Topal
 Mehmet Topuz
 Nihat Kahveci
 Necati Ateş
 Nuri Şahin
 Okan Buruk
 Saffet Sancaklı
 Semih Şentürk
 Sergen Yalçın
 Tuncay Şanlı
 Ümit Özat
 Volkan Demirel
 Yıldıray Baştürk

Former Coaches
 1957-1959:  Şeref Görkey
 1960-1962:  Şeref Görkey
 1976-1977:  Candan Tarhan
 1981-1982:  Şeref Görkey
 1984-1984:  Yılmaz Gökdel
 1990-1993:  Fatih Terim
 1993-1996:  Erdoğan Arıca
 1996-1998:  Rıza Çalımbay
 1998-2005:  Raşit Çetiner
 2005-2006:  Reha Kapsal
 2006-2006:  Tolunay Kafkas
 2006-2007:  Ünal Karaman
 2007-2008:  Ümit Davala
 2008-2010:  Hami Mandıralı
 2010-2012:  Raşit Çetiner
 2013-2018:  Abdullah Ercan
 2018-2018:  Alpay Özalan
 2018-2020:  Vedat İnceefe
 2020-present:  Tolunay Kafkas

See also
 Turkey national football team
Turkey national under-21 football team
 Turkey national under-20 football team
 Turkey national under-19 football team
 Turkey national under-17 football team
 Turkey national youth football team

Notes

References

External links

Turkish Football Federation Site

European national under-21 association football teams
Under